Umetbayevo (Ömötbay) is a rural locality (a village) in Bilyalovsky Selsoviet, Baymaksky District, Bashkortostan, Russia. The population was 535 as of 2010. There are 5 streets.

Geography 
Umetbayevo is located 73 km north of Baymak (the district's administrative centre) by road. Baymurzino is the nearest rural locality.

References 

Rural localities in Baymaksky District